Olivet is an unincorporated community in Giles County, Tennessee.

References

Unincorporated communities in Giles County, Tennessee
Unincorporated communities in Tennessee